Ionia is a city in Chickasaw County, Iowa, United States. The population was 226 at the time of the 2020 census.

Geography
Ionia is located at  (43.034493, -92.456606).

Demographics

2010 census
As of the census of 2010, there were 291 people, 119 households, and 74 families living in the city. The racial makeup of the city was 99.7% White and 0.3% from other races. Hispanic or Latino of any race were 0.7% of the population.

There were 119 households, of which 32.8% had children under the age of 18 living with them, 49.6% were married couples living together, 5.0% had a female householder with no husband present, 7.6% had a male householder with no wife present, and 37.8% were non-families. 32.8% of all households were made up of individuals, and 17.6% had someone living alone who was 65 years of age or older. The average household size was 2.45 and the average family size was 3.09.

The median age in the city was 36.8 years. 30.2% of residents were under the age of 18; 5.6% were between the ages of 18 and 24; 21.3% were from 25 to 44; 27.5% were from 45 to 64; and 15.5% were 65 years of age or older. The gender makeup of the city was 50.5% male and 49.5% female.

2000 census
As of the census of 2000, there were 277 people, 115 households, and 73 families living in the city. The racial makeup of the city was 100.00% White. Hispanic or Latino of any race were 0.72% of the population.

There were 115 households, out of which 31.3% had children under the age of 18 living with them, 57.4% were married couples living together, 3.5% had a female householder with no husband present, and 36.5% were non-families. 32.2% of all households were made up of individuals, and 16.5% had someone living alone who was 65 years of age or older. The average household size was 2.41 and the average family size was 3.12.

In the city, the population was spread out, with 25.6% under the age of 18, 7.2% from 18 to 24, 29.2% from 25 to 44, 22.0% from 45 to 64, and 15.9% who were 65 years of age or older. The median age was 39 years. For every 100 females, there were 111.5 males. For every 100 females age 18 and over, there were 104.0 males.

The median income for a household in the city was $35,357, and the median income for a family was $40,625. Males had a median income of $28,750 versus $21,250 for females. The per capita income for the city was $17,355. None of the population or families were below the poverty line.

Education
It is within the New Hampton Community School District.

Notable person
 Jack Cunningham, screenwriter
 Henry W. Wright, Speaker of the California State Assembly

References

Cities in Chickasaw County, Iowa
Cities in Iowa